Limited Edition Tour EP features three new songs from Phantom Planet's new studio record, Raise the Dead, released on April 15, 2008, as well as one b-side. It was released during their 2007 West Coast tour with Maroon 5, was available on tour and for order at the Fueled by Ramen webstore, and is now available as a digital download. The Raise the Dead versions of the songs have some extra tracking.

Track listing

References

Phantom Planet albums
2007 EPs

fi:Phantom Planet (albumi)